Out All Night is a 1927 American silent comedy film directed by William A. Seiter and starring Reginald Denny, Marian Nixon and Wheeler Oakman.

Cast 
 Reginald Denny as John Graham
 Marian Nixon as Molly O'Day
 Wheeler Oakman as Kerrigan
 Dorothy Earle as Rose
 Dan Mason as Uncle
 Alfred Allen as Captain
 Robert Seiter as Purser
 Ben Hendricks Jr. as Dr. Allen
 Billy Franey as Taxi Driver
 Harry Tracy as Valet (credited as Harry Tracey)
 Lionel Braham as Lionel Braham

References

External links

1927 comedy films
American silent feature films
American black-and-white films
1927 films
1920s English-language films
Universal Pictures films
Films directed by William A. Seiter
Silent American comedy films
1920s American films